The Copa Rodrigues Alves, was a friendly association football competition realized between Brazil and Paraguay, contested in the years of 1922 and 1923. The trophy name is in honor of Francisco de Paula Rodrigues Alves, former Brazilian president.

The first edition was held after the 1922 South American Championship, based in Brazil, and the second edition was held during the 1923 South American Championship, based in Uruguay.

Results

Matches

1922

1923

See also 
Taça Oswaldo Cruz

References  

Brazil national football team matches
Paraguay national football team matches
International association football competitions hosted by Brazil
International association football competitions hosted by Uruguay
Recurring sporting events established in 1922
Recurring sporting events disestablished in 1923
Defunct international association football competitions in South America